Ludmila Vindušková (born 3 January 1949) is a Czech volleyball player. She competed in the women's tournament at the 1972 Summer Olympics.

References

External links
 

1949 births
Living people
Czech women's volleyball players
Olympic volleyball players of Czechoslovakia
Volleyball players at the 1972 Summer Olympics
People from Světlá nad Sázavou
Sportspeople from the Vysočina Region